Giuseppe Laezza (1835-1905) was an Italian painter, mainly of landscapes.

Biography
He resided in Naples where in 1877 he exhibited: Dopo il tramonto; San Germano; Cassino, and Una mala pesca alla Marinella. Among his works are: A Procession of Children to the Festival of Ponti Rossi, End of the Grape Harvest; Panorama of Sorrento;Curiosity of a Painter; and Un bagno pubblico a San Giovanni a Teduccio, exhibited at Turin in 1884. He became a professor at Naples. He died in poverty.

References

 

1835 births
1905 deaths
19th-century Italian painters
19th-century Italian male artists
Italian male painters
20th-century Italian painters
20th-century Italian male artists
Painters from Naples
Italian landscape painters